Dominick Edward Blake  (October 13, 1833 – March 1, 1912), known as Edward Blake, was the second premier of Ontario, from 1871 to 1872 and leader of the Liberal Party of Canada from 1880 to 1887.  He is one of only three federal permanent Liberal leaders never to become Prime Minister of Canada, the others being Stéphane Dion and the latter's immediate successor Michael Ignatieff. He may be said to have served in the national politics of what developed as the affairs of three nationalities: Canadian, British, and Irish. Blake was also the founder, in 1856, of the Canadian law firm now known as Blake, Cassels & Graydon LLP.

Early years
Blake was born in 1833, in Adelaide Township, Middlesex County, Upper Canada, the son of William Hume Blake and Catherine Honoria Hume, and was educated at Upper Canada College.

In 1856, after Blake was called to the bar, he entered into partnership with Stephen M. Jarvis in Toronto to practice law. When his brother Samuel Hume Blake joined soon thereafter, the firm became Blake & Blake. Today it is known as Blake, Cassels & Graydon.

As a consequence of the ruling of the Judicial Committee of the Privy Council in Long v The Bishop of Cape Town, Blake offered a legal opinion to Benjamin Cronyn (then Bishop of the Anglican Diocese of Huron) on the legality of the convening of a Provincial Synod of the various Dioceses of the Ecclesiastical Province of Canada by Francis Fulford (then Bishop of Montreal and Metropolitan of Canada). He determined that the concurrence of all of the Dioceses of the Ecclesiastical Province would be required prior to the creation of the Provincial Synod, and therefore no such Synod could legally be convened until the entity first existed. This opinion was read into the Minutes of the seventh session of the Synod of the Diocese of Huron which convened in June 1864.

Political career

Canada
Blake was recruited into active politics by George Brown, elected Member of the Provincial Parliament (Durham West and Bruce South) became leader of the Ontario Liberal Party in 1868 and premier in 1871, but left provincial politics to run in the 1872 federal election, in which he was re-elected.  The "dual mandate" rule that allowed a politician to sit simultaneously in a provincial and federal house had been abolished, and Blake chose to abandon his career in provincial politics. He played a major role in exposing the government of Sir John A. Macdonald's complicity in the Pacific Scandal forcing the government's resignation. Blake was offered the prime ministership, but turned it down due to ill health.

When the Liberals won the subsequent 1874 federal election, Blake joined the cabinet of Prime Minister Alexander Mackenzie and served as Minister of Justice and President of the Queen's Privy Council for Canada.

From 1876 to 1900, he was the chancellor of the University of Toronto.

The Liberals were defeated in the 1878 election, and Blake succeeded Mackenzie as party leader in 1880. He failed to defeat Macdonald's Conservatives in the 1882 or 1887 elections. Blake resigned as Liberal leader in 1887, recruiting Wilfrid Laurier as his successor, and left the House of Commons of Canada in 1891.

Ireland
In the 1892 election, Blake entered the British House of Commons as an Irish Nationalist Member of Parliament (MP) for the constituency of South Longford in the midlands of Ireland. In 1895, he was appointed to the Royal Commission on the Financial Relations between Great Britain and Ireland, which reported in 1896. He continued to serve as MP until 1907 when he resigned following a stroke and retired to Canada.

Contributions to Canadian federalism
He is perhaps best remembered for the arguments he made to the Judicial Committee of the Privy Council in favour of the Provinces in interpreting the British North America Act. In 1888 he argued the case of St. Catherines Milling v. The Queen, where the federal government was claiming the right to issue timber licenses. This speech was quoted in its entirety in the 1960 report of the Quebec Royal Commission of Inquiry on Constitutional Problems, which influenced many Quebecers including René Lévesque:

He won the case and the Privy Council consistently afterwards took the side of the provinces.

Family

Edward Blake married Margaret Cronyn, the daughter of Benjamin Cronyn and Margaret Ann (Bickerstaff), in 1856. She was born in 1835 and was educated at London, Ontario and in Toronto. Mrs. Blake practiced benevolent and other useful work. She was a member of the Toronto Ladies' Educational Association and served as the Honorary President of the Canadian Branch of the McAll Association in Toronto. She also frequently accompanied her husband on his political tours. The couple had seven children, four of whom survived them. Their daughter Sophia Hume Blake married George M. Wrong and was the mother of Hume Wrong.

Archives 
The personal and family papers of Edward Blake  can be found at the Archives of Ontario, and the majority of these records were received on indefinite loan from the University of Toronto Library in June 1952. There are also Edward Blake archives at the University of Toronto and Library and Archives Canada.

References

External links 

 
 
 Edward Blake family fonds, Archives of Ontario
 
 Ronan O'Brien, "An Irishman's Diary", Irish Times, 13 August 2007 (subscription required)
 Ontario's Historical Plaques
Edward Blake archival papers held at the University of Toronto Archives and Record Management Services
 

1833 births
1912 deaths
Anti-Parnellite MPs
Canadian Anglicans
Canadian nationalists
Canadian people of Anglo-Irish descent
Canadian King's Counsel
Chancellors of the University of Toronto
Irish nationalists
Irish Parliamentary Party MPs
Lawyers in Ontario
Leaders of the Liberal Party of Canada
Leaders of the Ontario Liberal Party
Leaders of the Opposition (Canada)
Members of the House of Commons of Canada from Ontario
Members of the Parliament of the United Kingdom for County Longford constituencies (1801–1922)
Members of the King's Privy Council for Canada
Persons of National Historic Significance (Canada)
Premiers of Ontario
Treasurers of the Law Society of Upper Canada
UK MPs 1892–1895
UK MPs 1895–1900
UK MPs 1900–1906
UK MPs 1906–1910
Upper Canada College alumni
Burials at St. James Cemetery, Toronto